The Skopin constituency (No.157) is a Russian legislative constituency in Ryazan Oblast. The constituency was created in 2016 from western parts of former Shilovo constituency and parts of Ryazan constituency, taking half of Ryazan and almost all rural areas of the former constituency.

Members elected

Election results

2016

|-
! colspan=2 style="background-color:#E9E9E9;text-align:left;vertical-align:top;" |Candidate
! style="background-color:#E9E9E9;text-align:left;vertical-align:top;" |Party
! style="background-color:#E9E9E9;text-align:right;" |Votes
! style="background-color:#E9E9E9;text-align:right;" |%
|-
|style="background-color: " |
|align=left|Yelena Mitina
|align=left|United Russia
|
|48.26%
|-
|style="background-color:"|
|align=left|Vladimir Fedotkin
|align=left|Communist Party
|
|16.07%
|-
|style="background-color:"|
|align=left|Aleksandr Sherin
|align=left|Liberal Democratic Party
|
|14.10%
|-
|style="background-color:"|
|align=left|Natalia Tsvetkova
|align=left|A Just Russia
|
|6.02%
|-
|style="background:"| 
|align=left|Galina Lukyanova
|align=left|Communists of Russia
|
|4.04%
|-
|style="background-color:"|
|align=left|Aleksandr Tyurin
|align=left|Rodina
|
|2.10%
|-
|style="background:"| 
|align=left|Valentin Baymetov
|align=left|Yabloko
|
|2.03%
|-
|style="background:"| 
|align=left|Aleksandr Samokhin
|align=left|People's Freedom Party
|
|1.85%
|-
|style="background-color:"|
|align=left|Vladimir Denisenko
|align=left|The Greens
|
|1.67%
|-
|style="background:"| 
|align=left|Igor Tambovtsev
|align=left|Party of Growth
|
|1.19%
|-
| colspan="5" style="background-color:#E9E9E9;"|
|- style="font-weight:bold"
| colspan="3" style="text-align:left;" | Total
| 
| 100%
|-
| colspan="5" style="background-color:#E9E9E9;"|
|- style="font-weight:bold"
| colspan="4" |Source:
|
|}

2021

|-
! colspan=2 style="background-color:#E9E9E9;text-align:left;vertical-align:top;" |Candidate
! style="background-color:#E9E9E9;text-align:left;vertical-align:top;" |Party
! style="background-color:#E9E9E9;text-align:right;" |Votes
! style="background-color:#E9E9E9;text-align:right;" |%
|-
|style="background-color: " |
|align=left|Dmitry Khubezov
|align=left|United Russia
|
|48.06%
|-
|style="background-color:"|
|align=left|Yevgeny Morozov
|align=left|Communist Party
|
|14.66%
|-
|style="background-color:"|
|align=left|Aleksandr Sherin
|align=left|Liberal Democratic Party
|
|13.84%
|-
|style="background-color:"|
|align=left|Grigory Parsentyev
|align=left|A Just Russia — For Truth
|
|5.96%
|-
|style="background-color: " |
|align=left|Artur Zavyalov
|align=left|New People
|
|5.45%
|-
|style="background-color: "|
|align=left|Natalya Rubina
|align=left|Party of Pensioners
|
|4.07%
|-
|style="background:"| 
|align=left|Marina Tyurina
|align=left|Communists of Russia
|
|3.77%
|-
|style="background-color:"|
|align=left|Aleksandr Moseychuk
|align=left|The Greens
|
|1.56%
|-
| colspan="5" style="background-color:#E9E9E9;"|
|- style="font-weight:bold"
| colspan="3" style="text-align:left;" | Total
| 
| 100%
|-
| colspan="5" style="background-color:#E9E9E9;"|
|- style="font-weight:bold"
| colspan="4" |Source:
|
|}

References

Russian legislative constituencies
Politics of Ryazan Oblast